Justin J. McCarthy (born 1945 in Passage West, County Cork) is an Irish former hurling manager and former player, who took over as manager of the Limerick senior inter-county team in October 2008. He played hurling with his local club Passage and with the Cork senior inter-county team in the 1960s and 1970s.

As a player McCarthy was involved with the Cork team of the late 1960s. In a senior inter-county career that lasted from 1964 until 1974 he won one All-Ireland title, three Munster titles, two National Hurling League titles and two Railway Cup titles.

Over the last four decades McCarthy has had some success as a manager with many different teams. In the 1970s he coached Antrim to an All-Ireland title at intermediate level before capturing back-to-back National Hurling League titles with Clare. The 1980s saw McCarthy coach his own native Cork to two Munster titles and an All-Ireland triumph in the centenary year of the Gaelic Athletic Association. While in charge of the Waterford senior hurling team from 2001 to 2008 he guided the team to three Munster titles and one National Hurling League title. Waterford, in spite of being regarded as one of the top three teams in the country, failed to reach an All-Ireland final under McCarthy.

Biography
Justin McCarthy was born in Passage West, County Cork in 1945. From an early age he showed a huge interest in the game of hurling. McCarthy's hurling genes came from his mother's side of the family. Her brothers, Batt and Ger O'Mahony, had played with the Young Ireland's club in Boston and won the North American championship in 1934. When Bord na nÓg was formed in Cork in the 1950s McCarthy took part in the under-14, under-15 and under-16 competitions under the tutelage of Fr. Roch, a Kilkenny native. In 1955 he wore the red jersey of Cork for the first time when it was arranged for the altar boys of Cork to take on a group of altar boys from Kilkenny. It was a proud moment for McCarthy as Cork won. Justin's namesake his son Justin McCarthy works for Irish radio station Today FM as the station's political correspondent.

On 12 January 2005 McCarthy was profiled on the TG4 television programme Laochra Gael. His first autobiography 'Hooked. was published in 2002 and sold out completely. Despite appeals for a reprint, it never materialised. However, in 2017 a decision was made to publish a second autobiography detailing his time as Waterford manager (2002 - 2008), Limerick manager (2008 - 2010) and Antrim Coach (2015 - 2016).

Playing career

Club
McCarthy played his club hurling with his local club in Passage. He enjoyed some success at juvenile levels before moving onto the club's top team. Passage played in the county intermediate championship and last won the title in 1960, prior to McCarthy's playing days. Throughout the 1960s he had the opportunity to move to a more prominent city club but choose to stay with his native Passage. In 1975 Passage were back in the big time and contested the county final at intermediate level. Ballinhassig provided the opposition on that occasion and it was Ballinhassig who claimed the victory. In 1976 Passage were back in s second consecutive county final. On this occasion Newtownshandrum were the opponents and, once again, McCarthy ended up on the losing side. Remarkably, McCarthy continued playing with Passage until 1991 when he retired after winning a city divisional junior league title.

Minor and under-21
McCarthy first came to prominence on the inter-county scene as a member of the Cork minor hurling team in the early 1960s. He lined out for Cork in this grade in 1963, however, his side was defeated in the early rounds of the championship. In 1964 McCarthy was a key member of both the Cork under-21 and intermediate hurling teams. Success was slow in coming but the big breakthrough for Cork and McCarthy came in 1966. That year he won a Munster title with the under-21 team following a 5–12 to 2–6 defeat of Limerick. The subsequent All-Ireland final saw Cork play Wexford in an interesting encounter. After an entertaining sixty minutes of hurling both sides finished level with Cork scoring 3–12 to Wexford's 5–6. The replay took place shortly afterwards, however, both sides finished all square again with 4–9 apiece. A second replay had to be played to eventually find a winner. At the third time of asking Cork emerged victorious with a huge tally of 9–9 to 5–9. This victory gave Cork their first All-Ireland title in this grade and gave McCarthy an All-Ireland under-21 medal.

Senior
McCarthy made his debut for the Cork senior team in 1964. The decade after the 1956 All-Ireland final appearance was a bleak period for Cork's senior hurling team; however, in 1966 McCarthy was a key player at midfield as Cork hurling returned to the big time. That year Cork avoided Tipperary, their old tormentors in the provincial championship, and qualified for a Munster showdown with Waterford. An entertaining hour of hurling followed, however, victory went to Cork for the first time in ten years. It was McCarthy's first senior Munster medal. This victory allowed Cork to advance directly to the All-Ireland final where arch-rivals Kilkenny provided the opposition. It was the first meeting of these two sides since 1947 and "the Cats" were installed as the firm favourites. In spite of this, two goals by Colm Sheehan and a third from John O'Halloran gave Cork a merited 3–9 to 1–10 victory over an Eddie Keher inspired Kilkenny. It was McCarthy's first senior All-Ireland medal. His performances at midfield throughout the championship set him apart, and he was honoured with the Caltex Hurler of the Year award. At 21 he was the youngest person ever to receive the award, a record which stood until it was broken by McCarthy's fellow county men Pat McDonnell and Brian Corcoran. In spite of being named player of the year McCarthy was not the recipient of a Cu Chulainn award, the precursor of the All-Star awards.

Tipperary emerged as the Munster champions in both 1967 and 1968, however, Cork were back in 1969. That year McCarthy tasted success early in the year Cork defeated Wexford by 3–12 to 1–14 to take the National Hurling League title. This victory gave Cork a huge boost going into the Munster campaign where the team qualified to meet Tipperary in the final. Cork were out to avenge the nine-point defeat administered by the same side in 1968 while Tipp were out to capture a third provincial title in-a-row. The game was a major triumph for Cork as "the Rebels" won by 4–6 to 0–9. It was a victory that made up for all the beatings that Tipp had dished out to Cork in the early part of the decade and it gave McCarthy a second Munster winners' medal. Once again this victory paved the way for an All-Ireland showdown with Kilkenny. On the week of the game, however, McCarthy was on his way to training when he was involved in a horrific motorbike accident and he broke his leg in three places. In the short-term this meant that he had to watch the entire All-Ireland final from a wheelchair on the sideline. Cork lost the game after leading "the Cats" coming into the last quarter. In the long-term McCarthy's injury meant that he also missed out on Cork's championship campaign in 1970, the year which saw the team capture further National League, Munster and All-Ireland honours.

McCarthy returned to the Cork set-up in 1972, making his comeback in a national League game against Dublin. Cork defeated Limerick in the final of that competition, giving McCarthy a second National League medal. Later that summer Cork lined out against Clare in the Munster final. It was McCarthy's first championship game in three years. Cork recorded a huge 6–18 to 2–8 victory over the "banner" men. It was McCarthy's third Munster winners' medal. Another comprehensive victory over surprise package London in the All-Ireland semi-final allowed Cork to advance to the championship decider where, once again, Kilkenny provided the opposition. The game itself is regarded as one of the classic games of the modern era. With time running out Cork were cruising to victory and led "the Cats" by eight points. A Kilkenny fight-back, however, saw the team draw level with Cork and score seven further points without reply to capture a 3–24 to 5–11 victory. It was a huge blow to a Cork team that seemed destined for victory.

Cork lost their provincial crown to Limerick in 1973, however, in 1974 the team bounced back with McCarthy capturing a third National League medal as a non-playing substitute. Success in the championship was not so easy and Cork were defeated by Waterford in the opening round of the provincial campaign. Following this defeat McCarthy decided to retire from inter-county hurling.

Provincial
McCarthy also lined out with Munster in the inter-provincial hurling competition, the Railway Cup. He first played with his province in 1967, however, Munster were defeated on that occasion by their great rivals Leinster. McCarthy was picked on the Munster team again in 1968. That year Munster overcame Leinster in the final to capture the title. McCarthy won a second consecutive Railway Cup medal in 1969 as Munster trounced Connacht by 3–13 to 4–4. This was his last outing with the province.

Early coaching career

Antrim
Over the last four decades McCarthy has been hugely interested in managing and coaching various teams at various levels all over the country. He first became involved in coaching in 1969 when he was recuperating following his motorcycle accident. During his time out from the playing McCarthy travelled to the opposite end of the country where he was invited to give coaching lessons to the Antrim hurlers. He was hugely successful in this capacity as Antrim claimed the All-Ireland title at intermediate level in 1970 following a convincing win over Warwickshire.

Cork (1975–1976)
Not long after his retirement from playing McCarthy became fully involved in the management side of hurling. In 1975 he was appointed trainer of the Cork senior hurling team for the first time. In this regard he guided his native county to a Munster final victory over Limerick, the first of five provincial wins in-a-row. Cork were subsequently defeated by Galway in the All-Ireland semi-final by just two points. Following this defeat McCarthy resigned as trainer.

Clare (1977–1980)
Just before the start of 1977 McCarthy was approached by then manager Fr. Harry Bohan to become his co-manager of the Clare senior hurlers. McCarthy accepted the offer, a decision which came as a surprise to many people in Cork. His first season in charge was a successful one from the very beginning. Clare had had a good National League campaign and qualified for the final in 1977. Kilkenny, the reigning champions and victors over Clare in the final of 1976, provided the opposition on this occasion and an interesting game ensued. Clare's ability to get goals at crucial times proved vital and they claimed the 2–8 to 0–9 victory. With this victory under their belt Clare were widely tipped for success in the provincial championship. The team did reach the Munster final that year where McCarthy's native county of Cork provided the opposition. Clare got off to a really bad start when they conceded a penalty after seventy-five seconds which was duly converted by Tim Crowley. Instead of crumbling Clare battled back and really put Cork to the pin of their collar. At half-time they trailed by only one point, however, they were reduced to fourteen men after Jim Power was sent off. The second half was another interesting tussle, however, Cork won by 4–15 to 4–10.

In 1978 Clare stormed through the National League again and qualified for the final for the third year in-a-row. Once again Kilkenny provided the opposition and, once again, an interesting game ensued. Clare's ability to get goals once proved the defining feature of a close game as McCarthy's side went on to win by 3–10 to 1–10. This victory buoyed up Clare for the provincial championship where they qualified for a second consecutive Munster showdown with Cork. Over 54,000 spectators turned up at Semple Stadium that day to see Clare attempt to dethrone Cork. At half-time it looked as if Clare were about to triumph as they trailed by 0–5 to 0–3 after Cork recorded thirteen wides. With ten minutes left Cork led by five points, however, a late rally gave Clare some hope. At the full-time whistle Cork still had a narrow 0–13 to 0–11 win.

This victory proved to be Clare's last chance of a championship breakthrough. McCarthy remained with the Clare hurlers until their exit from the championship in June 1980.

Cork (1984–1985)
In 1984, McCarthy was back as joint-coach of the Cork senior hurling team with the Rev. Michael O'Brien. It was the second time that he was coach of his native county. That year McCarthy helped guide Cork to their third Munster title in succession. The provincial final win over Tipperary was truly remarkable given the fact that Cork were trailing by four points with four minutes to go and ended up winning the game by four points. This victory allowed Cork to advance directly to the centenary year All-Ireland final. Offaly provided the opposition on that occasion in a very special championship decider at Semple Stadium in Thurles. It was their first meeting in the history of the championship, however, Cork were the favourites. A 3–16 to 1–12 victory gave McCarthy's Cork a reasonably easy but a very special victory nonetheless.

In 1985 both McCarthy and O'Brien guided Cork to another Munster final appearance. Once again provincial rivals Tipperary stood in their way. The coaches had prepared their team well and a 4–17 to 4–11 victory was the result. The subsequent All-Ireland semi-final saw Cork take on Galway. McCarthy's side were the favourites going into the game, however, Galway had other ideas. A 4–12 to 5–5 defeat showed that the Cork team were far off the championship pace. This defeat was McCarthy's last championship in charge of the side and a new management team was installed at the end of the year.

Cashel King Cormac's
Another challenge beckoned in 1990 when McCarthy took charge of the Tipperary side Cashel King Cormac's. It had been fifty years since the side had reached the final of the Tipperary County Championship, however, in his first year in charge McCarthy steered them towards the final which they lost by one point. The following year they won the county championship before claiming the Munster club title. McCarthy's side almost reached the All-Ireland club final, however, they were beaten by eventual winners Kiltormer of Galway at the semi-final stage after playing two replays to decide the winner. McCarthy remained with Cashel until 1995.

Managing Waterford
McCarthy was appointed manager of the Waterford senior hurling team on 30 July 2001. He wasn't the only candidate nominated for the position and was initially appointed for a two-year term. He succeeded his former team-mate Gerald McCarthy as manager and beat off several former Waterford greats for the post.

McCarthy's very first championship game in charge posed quite a challenge. Waterford were drawn to play McCarthy's native county of Cork in the Munster semi-final. It was a tough assignment for the new manager, however, Waterford came through it to win by a single point. With his first victory behind him McCarthy's team subsequently lined out against reigning Munster and All-Ireland champions Tipperary in the provincial final. The game was in the balance for much of the seventy minutes with both sides being level six times in all. The last quarter saw Waterford assert themselves and they went on to win the game on a score line of 2–23 to 3–12. It was Waterford's first Munster title since 1963 and McCarthy was lauded as a hero. Waterford's next game was an All-Ireland semi-final meeting with Clare.  Clare were defeated in the first-round of the provincial championship, however, they reached the penultimate stage of the All-Ireland series via the qualifiers. Waterford were expected to win, however, victory went to the men from the West.

In 2003 McCarthy's side set out to retain their provincial title. Once again the team swept through Munster and reached the provincial final where Cork provided the opposition. At half-time Waterford looked on course to capture a second consecutive Munster title, however, Cork fought back in the second half to snatch a 3–16 to 3–12 victory. McCarthy's team were down but not out, however, their next outing in the All-Ireland qualifiers system ended in defeat.

In 2004 McCarthy's side marched to a third consecutive Munster final appearance following defeat in the National League final. Once again Cork provided the opposition and Waterford were out to avenge the previous year's defeat. McCarthy's side got off to the worst possible start when Cork scored a soft goal after just three minutes. The Deise settled down quickly after that and got right back into the game. The result was still in the balance up until the final second, however, McCarthy's men won on a score line of 3–16 to 1–21. The game itself is considered one of the greatest of all-time. Waterford's next outing was an All-Ireland semi-final meeting with Kilkenny. "The Cats" were not as spectacular as they had been in previous seasons, however, McCarthy's side were defeated by 3–12 to 0–18.

In 2005 Waterford faced Cork in the Munster championship for the fourth season in-a-row. Once again McCarthy's team conceded an early goal, however, the result was much tighter at the end. Cork won the day on a score line of 2–17 to 2–15 and confined Waterford to the qualifiers. McCarthy's side came through the qualifiers system successfully, however, the random draw for the All-Ireland quarter-finals meant that Waterford had to play Cork for a second time. The game was less exciting than previous meetings with Cork winning by five points.

In 2006 McCarthy's side fell to Tipperary in the Munster semi-final. The qualifiers proved a happy hunting ground for Waterford as they won every one of their games in the round robin and topped the group. The men from the Deise later gained revenge on Tipp in the All-Ireland quarter-final before lining out against Cork in the All-Ireland semi-final. Once again the game proved to be an exciting and close affair, with neither side gaining any huge lead. Cork led with just seconds remaining in the game when Donal Óg Cusack, Cork's goalkeeper, saved a '65' from going over the bar. The sliothar was subsequently cleared, and Cork won the game by just a single point. After the game McCarthy came in for some criticism, however, the players insisted that he was the men to lead them again for another season.

The players' faith in McCarthy was rewarded early in 2007 when he led them to a National League title. The victory over Kilkenny was all the sweeter as it was Waterford's first league success since 1963. The subsequent Munster championship saw Waterford take on Cork once again. Cork were severely depleted due to the suspension of some of their key players, however, the game turned out to be another classic between the greatest hurling rivals of the decade. The score line of 5–15 to 3–18 tells its own story with McCarthy's men capturing the victory. The Munster final saw the Decies paired against Limerick. It was the teams' first meeting in the provincial decider since 1958. Justin's men showed their class in the final quarter and won by eight points. Waterford captured their third Munster titles in six years under McCarthy. McCarthy's men later faced Cork for the second time, however, the game ended in a draw after a controversial free. Waterford won the replay setting up a second meeting with Limerick. Waterford has to play a third high-profile game in two weeks, and this showed on the day when Limerick caught them on the hop and won a place in the All Ireland final. Most people believed that Waterford were unfairly treated by the system and they should have got at least two weeks to prepare for the semi-final after playing two tough games against Cork. McCarthy's men had failed at the All-Ireland semi-final stage. Once again there was some criticism of the manager, however, the players indicated that they wished McCarthy to stay on for another year. Dan Shanahan and John Mullane spoke out and publicly said that he was the only man they wanted for the job and Once again their request was granted.

In 2008 expectations were high that Waterford would retain their Munster title and challenge for the All-Ireland once again. After a disappointing National League campaign and a nine-point loss to Clare in the first round of the championship a players meeting was held where it was indicated that some of the team no longer wanted McCarthy in charge. From that another meeting with the County Board was held where McCarthy resigned as manager. McCarthy had a successful reign over Waterford and most will remember all the great games that he was involved in but will also remember the fact that Waterford never reached an All-Ireland final under him.

Managing Limerick
On 7 October 2008 McCarthy was named as the new manager of the Limerick senior hurling team. His side started the Munster Championship with a draw with Waterford, but were beaten in the replay. They then entered the Qualifier System and had wins over Wexford and Laois. They then were drawn against beaten Leinster finalists Dublin in Semple Stadium. Despite going into the game as underdogs Limerick came out 2–18 to 1–17 winners. The semi-final paired Limerick with Tipperary however Tipperary proved too strong on the day and won 6–19 to 2–07.

In 2009 following the heavy loss to Tipperary, McCarthy dropped a number of high-profile players from the training panel for the 2010 season which led to a number of other players not making themselves available.
In January 2010, members of the ousted Limerick hurling panel issued a lengthy statement hitting out at McCarthy and his management team ahead of the EGM of all county board delegates. The statement highlighted their six main issues detailing back to the lack of communication in the lead up to the announcement of McCarthy's winter training panel in November 2009.
A vote on McCarthy's leadership took place in December 2009, and it was decided to retain McCarthy's services as manager. His role as Limerick hurling manager came under more pressure in March 2010 as it became clear that a special county board meeting had been arranged. At the meeting on 23 March, McCarthy retained his post following a failed vote of no confidence.
On 19 July 2010 McCarthy resigned as manager after his side was knocked out of the qualifiers by Offaly.

Honours

Player
Cork
All-Ireland Senior Hurling Championship:
Winner (1): 1966
Runner-up (1): 1972
Munster Senior Hurling Championship:
Winner (3): 1966, 1969, 1972
Runner-up (3): 1964, 1965, 1968
National Hurling League:
Winner (3): 1969, 1972, 1974 (sub)
All-Ireland Under-21 Hurling Championship:
Winner (1): 1966
Munster Under-21 Hurling Championship:
Winner (1): 1966

Munster
Railway Cup:
Winner (2): 1968, 1969
Runner-up (1): 1967

Coach/Manager
Antrim
All-Ireland Intermediate Hurling Championship:
Winner (1): 1970
Ulster Intermediate Hurling Championship:
Winner (1): 1970

Clare
Munster Senior Hurling Championship:
Runner-up (2): 1977, 1978
National Hurling League:
Winner (2): 1977, 1978

Cork
All-Ireland Senior Hurling Championship:
Winner (1) 1984
Munster Senior Hurling Championship:
Winner (3): 1975, 1984, 1985

Cashel King Cormac's
Munster Senior Club Hurling Championship:
Winner (1): 1991
Tipperary Senior Hurling Championship:
Winner (1): 1991
Runner-up (2): 1990, 1994

Waterford
Munster Senior Hurling Championship:
Winner (3): 2002, 2004, 2007
Runner-up (1): 2003
National Hurling League:
Winner (1): 2007
Runner-up (1): 2004

References

1945 births
Living people
Passage West hurlers
Seandún hurlers
Cork inter-county hurlers
Munster inter-provincial hurlers
Hurling selectors
Hurling managers
All-Ireland Senior Hurling Championship winners